Times Bookstore is a part of the Times Publishing Group, which started from Singapore in 1978.

Current Operations
There are currently Times Bookstore chains throughout Singapore (6 as Times Bookstore and 1 Times Travel at Changi Airport) and Macau (1 Times Bookstore at The Venetian Macao).

Former Operations
Times Bookstore opened at Lippo Karawaci Lippo Supermall in Indonesia in 2008 Lippo Supermall location has since closed and second location at Universitas Pelita Harapan was converted as Books and Beyond in 2012.

Notes

External links

 Times Bookstore Malaysia
 Times Bookstore Singapore

Retail companies of Singapore
Singaporean brands